Post Bahadur Bogati (18 July 1953 – 15 September 2014) represented Unified Communist Party of Nepal (Maoist) in the CA Election-2008. He was assigned as the General Secretary from the 7th convention of UCPN- Maoist, held in Hetauda. He was the Minister for Information and Communications as well as Minister for Culture, Tourism and Civil Aviation. He was also the vice-chairman of UCPN (Maoist).

Bogati died on 15 September 2014 due to cardiac arrest followed by brain hemorrhage in Norvic International Hospital, Kathmandu, Nepal.

References

1953 births
2014 deaths
People from Nuwakot District
Communist Party of Nepal (Maoist Centre) politicians
Government ministers of Nepal
Khas people
Members of the 1st Nepalese Constituent Assembly